

Events 
 January–March 
 January 22 — Led by Hasekura Tsunenaga, Japan's trade expedition to New Spain (now Mexico) arrives on the Mexican coast with 22 samurai, 120 Japanese merchants, sailors and servants, and 40 Spaniards and Portuguese who serve as interpreters.   Having reached the Americas after a voyage that began on October 28, the expedition travels to Acapulco and arrives on January 25. 
 January 27 — The Noordsche Compagnie in founded in the Netherlands at Vlieland as a cartel in the whaling market.
 February 2 — Iran's Safavid dynasty Emperor, Abbas the Great, carries out the execution of his oldest son, Crown Prince Mohammad Baqer Mirza, on suspicion that his son is planning to kill him. 
 February 14 (February 4 O.S.) – King James I of England issues his proclamation Against Private Challenges and Combats in an effort to end duels.
 February 20 — Matthias I, Archduke of Austria, King of Hungary, Croatia and Bohemia, and Holy Roman Emperor, directs the restoration of Roman Catholic rule to Aachen, allowing the Army of Flanders (from the Spanish Netherlands) to lay siege to the German town. 
 March 15 – Construction begins on the Takada Castle in Japan.
 March 17 – The States General of the Republic of the Seven United Netherlands  authorizes an exclusive monopoly for trade in the New World, providing for the winning company to be able to make four voyages to the eastern coast of North America between 40° N and 45° N, encompassing what are now the U.S. states of New Jersey. The New Netherland Company receives the exclusive patent, effective January 1, 1615.

 April–June 
 April 5 (April 15 N.S.)– 
Pocahontas, the 17-year=old daughter of Chief Wahunsenacawh of the Powhatan Algonquian  native tribe in what is now the U.S. state of Virginia, is forced into child marriage with English colonist John Rolfe at Jamestown, a year after her capture in war. She is given the name of Rebecca Rolfe and departs with John Rolfe to England in 1616, dying before she can return.
The Addled Parliament is assembled in England as the second parliament of King James I, and the first in more than nine years. Its members serve for two months without passing any laws.
The Republic of the Netherlands and the Kingdom of Sweden enter into a treaty at the Hague. A new parliament will not be seated until more than six years later. 
 April 30 — The Kingdom of Lan Na (in what is now northern Thailand) is invaded by 17,000 troops commanded by King Anaukpetlun of Burma (now Myanmar). Lan Na's King Thado Kyaw is unsuccessful in getting assistance from the Kingdom of Siam, and turns to the Kingdom of Lan Xang] (now Laos), which provides assistance. 
 May 14 – An earthquake strikes the Azores islands and levels the village of Vila Franca do Campo.
 May 15 — The Queen Regent of France, Marie de' Medici, convenes the Estates General to suppress a rebellion by Henri II, Prince of Condé. 
 May 17 – Mutinous "konfederacja" Polish troops are defeated at the Battle of Rohatyn by the Polish Army, led by General Stanisław Koniecpolski.
 June 7 – The Addled Parliament is dissolved by King James.

 July–September 
 July 6 – Raid of Żejtun: Ottoman forces make a final attempt to conquer the island of Malta, but are beaten back by the Knights Hospitaller.
 July 16 – In reprisal for the attempt of "the False Dmitry", a man who claimed to be the son of Ivan the Terrible, to claim the throne, Tsar Michael I has Dmitry's 3-year-old son,  Ivan Dmitriyevich, publicly hanged in Moscow.
 August 23 – The University of Groningen is established in the Dutch Republic.
 August 24 – The Siege of Aachen begins as the Spanish Army of Flanders, commanded by Amrogio Spinola, attacks with 15,000 troops. The 600-man defense force from Brandenburg surrenders a few days later. 
 September 1 – In England, Sir Julius Caesar becomes Master of the Rolls.

 October–December 
 October 2 – After Louis XIII reaches the age of 23, he is given full power as King of France and the regency of his mother is ended. Queen Regent Marie retains her position as leader of the Conseil du Roi, however, and continues to control the French government.
 October 11 – Adriaen Block and a group of Amsterdam merchants petition the States General of the Northern Netherlands for exclusive trading rights, in the area he explored and named "New Netherland".
 October 13 – The second War of the Jülich Succession, which flared up a second time in May, comes to an end. 
 October 17 – On the orders of Ahmed I, Sultan of the Ottoman Empire, Grand Vizier Nasuh Pasha is strangled to death by the chief of the Sultan's bodyguards.
 November 12 – The Treaty of Xanten ends the War of the Jülich Succession.
 November 19 – Hostilities resulting from an attempt by Toyotomi Hideyori to restore Osaka Castle begin. Tokugawa Ieyasu, father of the shōgun, is outraged at this act, and leads three thousand men across the Kizu River, destroying the fort there.
 December 4 – The Siege of Osaka begins in Japan.

 Date unknown 
 The French Estates General meets for the last time prior to 1789 (the outbreak of the French Revolution). In the interim, the Kingdom of France will be governed as an absolute monarchy.
 Scottish mathematician John Napier publishes Mirifici Logarithmorum Canonis Descriptio (Description of the Admirable Table of Logarithms), outlining his discovery of logarithms, and incorporating the decimal mark. Astronomer Johannes Kepler soon begins to employ logarithms, in his description of the Solar System.
 Tisquantum, a Native American of the Wampanoag Nation, is kidnapped and enslaved by Thomas Hunt, an English sea captain working with Captain John Smith. Freed in Spain, Tisquantum (a.k.a. Squanto) will travel for five years in Europe and North America, before returning to his home in Plymouth, Massachusetts. Twenty months later, he will be able to teach the Pilgrims the basics of farming and trade in the New World.
 The Fama Fraternitatis is published, the first of three allegorical Rosicrucian manifestoes in the Holy Roman Empire
 Christianity is banned throughout Japan.
The Duchess of Malfi is performed at the Globe theatre

Births

January–March
 January 1
 Henry Frederick, Hereditary Prince of the Palatinate (d. 1629)
 Luis Guillermo de Moncada, 7th Duke of Montalto, Spanish Catholic cardinal (d. 1672)
 January 5 – Archduke Leopold Wilhelm of Austria, Governor of the Spanish Netherlands (d. 1662)
 January 10 – Kanō Yasunobu, Japanese painter of the Kanō school of painting, during the Edo period (d. 1685)
 January 20 – Samuel Gott, English politician (d. 1671)
 February 2 – Robert Ellison, English politician (d. 1678)
 February 8 – Thomas Wendy, English politician (d. 1673)
 February 14 – John Wilkins, English bishop, academic and natural philosopher (d. 1672)
 February 16 – Christopher Merret, English physician and scientist (d. 1695)
 March 3 – Sir Peter Leycester, 1st Baronet, British historian (d. 1678)
 March 8 – Hendrik van der Borcht II, German painter (d. 1676)
 March 15 – Franciscus Sylvius, Dutch physician and scientist (d. 1672)
 March 25
 Thomas Chicheley, English politician who fell from favour, during the reign of James II (d. 1699)
 Juan Carreño de Miranda, Spanish artist (d. 1685)

April–June
 April 1 – Martin Schoock, Dutch academic (d. 1669)
 April 2 – Jahanara Begum, Mughal princess (d. 1681)
 April 10 – William Thompson, English Member of Parliament (d. 1681)
 April 11 – Helena Fourment, Dutch model, second wife of Peter Paul Rubens (d. 1673)
 April 18 – Nicolas Robert, French painter (d. 1685)
 April 25
 Hieronymus van Beverningh, Dutch diplomat and politician (d. 1690)
 Marc'Antonio Pasqualini, Italian opera singer and composer (d. 1691)
 May 10 – Zacharias Wagenaer, secretary, painter, then merchant and administrator (Dutch East-India Company) (d. 1668)
 May 12 – Giovanni Bernardo Carboni, Italian painter (d. 1683)
 May 28 – Gustav Evertsson Horn, Finnish-Swedish politician, Field Marshal (d. 1666)
 June 15 – Emilie of Oldenburg-Delmenhorst, Regent of Schwarzburg-Rudolstadt (1646–1662) (d. 1670)
 June 24 – John Belasyse, 1st Baron Belasyse of England (d. 1689)

July–September
 July 10 – Arthur Annesley, 1st Earl of Anglesey, English royalist statesman (d. 1686)
 July 23 – Bonaventura Peeters the Elder, Flemish marine painter (d. 1652)
 August 3 – Juan de Arellano, Spanish artist (d. 1676)
 August 13 – Augustus, Duke of Saxe-Weissenfels, administrator of the archbishopric of Magdeburg (d. 1680)
 September 7 – Gustaf Otto Stenbock, Swedish soldier and politician (d. 1685)
 September 11 – Philipp Buchner, German composer (d. 1669)
 September 12 – Robert Packer, English politician (d. 1682)
 September 20 – Martino Martini, Italian missionary, cartographer and historian (d. 1661)
 September 25 – Giles Hungerford, English politician (d. 1685)
 September 27 – Daniel Hallé, French painter (d. 1675)
 September 28 – Juan Hidalgo de Polanco, Spanish composer (d. 1685)

October–December
 October 3 – Sigmund von Erlach, Swiss politician (d. 1699)
 October 6 – Francesco de' Medici, Tuscan prince (d. 1634)
 October 12 – Henry More, English philosopher (d. 1687)
 October 13 – Thomas Jones, English politician and judge (d. 1692)
 October 20 (bapt.) – Franciscus Mercurius van Helmont, Flemish alchemist (d. 1698)
 November 2 – Philip Dietrich, Count of Waldeck-Eisenberg (1640–1645) (d. 1645)
 November 4 – Alexander Charles Vasa, 5th son of King Sigismund III of Poland (d. 1634)
 November 11 – John Bulkeley, English politician (d. 1662)
 November 27 – Fernando de Meneses, 2nd Count of Ericeira, Portuguese noble (d. 1699)
 November 30 – William Howard, 1st Viscount Stafford of England (d. 1680)
 December 16 – Eberhard III, Duke of Württemberg (d. 1674)
 December 21 – Francis Anderson, English politician (d. 1679)
 December 27 – Béatrix de Cusance, Frenc-Comtois noble woman (d. 1663)
 December 31 – Mechtilde of the Blessed Sacrament, French nun (d. 1698)

Date unknown
 Franciscus Sylvius, German scientist (d. 1672)
 Song Wan, Qing Dyansty poet and politician

Deaths

January–March 
 January 2 – Serafino Porrecta, Italian theologian (b. 1536)
 January 21 – Morosina Morosini-Grimani, Venetian patrician and dogaressa  (b. 1545)
 February 5 – Jakob Ebert, German theologian (b. 1549)
 February 13 – Thomas Cambell, Lord Mayor of London (b. 1536)
 February 23 – Murakoshi Naoyoshi, Japanese samurai (b. 1562)
 February 27 – John Harington, 2nd Baron Harington of Exton, England (b. 1592)
 February 28 – Jean Richardot the Younger, Belgian politician (b. 1570)
 March 5 – Thomas Pounde, English Jesuit lay brother (b. 1538)
 March 14 – Henrich Smet, Flemish physician (b. 1535)
 March 22 – Filippo Salviati, Italian astronomer (b. 1582)

April–June 
 April 2 – Henri I de Montmorency, Marshal of France (b. 1534)
 April 7 – El Greco, or Domênikos Theotokópoulos (Greek: Δομήνικος Θεοτοκόπουλος), Cretian painter, sculptor and architect (b. 1541)
 April 28 – John Egerton, English politician (b. 1551)
 May 3 – Sasbout Vosmeer, Dutch Apostolic Vicar (b. 1548)
 June 13 – Sengoku Hidehisa, Japanese daimyō (b. 1552)
 June 15 – Henry Howard, 1st Earl of Northampton, important English aristocrat and courtier (b. 1540)
 June 17 – William Bathe, Irish Jesuit priest (b. 1564)
 June 27 – Maeda Toshinaga, Japanese daimyō (b. 1562)

July–September 
 July 1
 Maximiliano de Austria, Roman Catholic prelate who served as Archbishop of Santiago de Compostela (1603–1614) (b. 1555)
 Isaac Casaubon, French-born classical scholar (b. 1559)
 July 4 – Johannes Magirus the elder, German Lutheran theologian (b. 1537)
 July 6
 Sir Anthony Cope, 1st Baronet, English politician (b. 1548)
 Man Singh I, Rajput Raja of Amer, India (b. 1550)
 July 14 – Camillus de Lellis, Italian saint (b. 1550)
 July 15 – Pierre de Bourdeille, seigneur de Brantôme, French historian and biographer
 July 16 – Tsarevich Ivan Dmitriyevich, pretender to the Russian throne, son of False Dmitry II (b. 1611)
 July 19 – Akizuki Tanenaga, Japanese samurai (b. 1567)
 July 28 – Felix Plater, Swiss physician (b. 1536)
 July 30 – Walter Cope, English noble (b. 1553)
 August 3 – François de Bourbon, Prince of Conti, third son of Louis I de Bourbon (b. 1558)
 August 11 – Lavinia Fontana, Italian painter (b. 1552)
 August 21 – Elizabeth Báthory, Hungarian noblewoman and purported serial killer (b. 1560)
 August 22 – Philipp Ludwig, Count Palatine of Neuburg, Duke of Palatinate-Neuburg from 1569 until 1614 (b. 1547)
 September – Giovanni de Macque, Dutch composer (b. c. 1550)
 September 21 – Jerome Gratian, Spanish Carmelite and writer (b. 1545)

October–December 
 October 2 – Carlo Sellitto, Italian painter (b. 1581)
 October 9 – Bonaventura Vulcanius, Flemish Renaissance humanist (b. 1538)
 October 15 – Peder Claussøn Friis, Norwegian clergyman and author (b. 1545)
 October 26 – Sibylla of Anhalt, Duchess consort of Württemberg (1593–1608) (b. 1564)
 November 15 – Catherine, Duchess of Braganza, Portuguese infanta (princess), claimant to the throne following the death of King Henry (b. 1540)
 November 29 – Mogami Yoshiaki, Japanese daimyō of the Yamagata domain (b. 1546)
 December 27 – Maximiliaan de Vriendt, Dutch new Latin poet and a civic office-holder in the city of Ghent (b. 1559)

Date unknown
 Bartholomäus Scultetus, mayor of Görlitz (b. 1540)
 Ebba Stenbock, politically active Swedish-Finnish noblewoman

References